Maria Bertolini (17 September 1931 – 14 June 2022, married name Koppelstäter) was an Italian politician. She was a member of the Council of South Tyrol in its 7th, 8th, 9th and 10th sessions, representing the Bolzano constituency for the South Tyrolean People's Party (SVP, Südtiroler Volkspartei)

She was born in Merano on 17 September 1931.

References

1931 births
2022 deaths
South Tyrolean People's Party politicians
Members of the Landtag of South Tyrol
20th-century Italian women politicians
People from Merano